Zierer Karussell- und Spezialmaschinenbau GmbH & Co. KG (Short name: Zierer ) is a German company located close to Deggendorf. Zierer manufactures Tivoli and Force line of roller coasters, as well as panoramic wheels, wave swingers, flying carpets, Hexentanz, and Kontiki rides. The company also has partnered with Schwarzkopf to build Lisebergbanan at Liseberg and Knightmare at Camelot Theme Park.

The name of the company, translated from German, is Zierer Carousel and Special Machine Construction. "Special machine construction" refers to amusement rides such as roller coasters or wave swingers.

Zierer was founded in 1930, and is a subsidiary of Max Streicher GmbH & Co. KG aA.

List of roller coasters

As of 2023, Zierer has built 193 roller coasters around the world.

References

External links 

 
 Listing of Zierer roller coasters at the Roller Coaster DataBase

Amusement ride manufacturers
Companies based in Bavaria
Roller coaster manufacturers
Technology companies of Germany